Bereket Simon (born 1960s) is an Ethiopian politician who had served as Communications Minister for the ruling Ethiopian People's Revolutionary Democratic Front (EPRDF), of which he was a founding member. He underwent medical treatment in Saudi Arabia financed by the billionaire Mohammed Alamudin. He was a close friend of former prime minister Meles Zenawi since their University days. He was widely considered as Meles Zenawi's right-hand man.

Personal life 
Bereket was born in Dabat to an Eritrean family. As he was in high school in 1978, he was likely born in the 1960s.

Legal issues 
On 23 January 2019, Bereket was arrested by the Amhara Region government in relation to corruption along with Tadesse Kassa, a civil servant. On 8 May 2020, Bereket was convicted of corruption and sentenced to six years of prison. Tadesse Kassa, a former TIRET Corporation board member, was also convicted. However, after serving probation in prison located in Bahir Dar, the government released him on account of parole on 25 January 2023. According to his defense lawyer Hiwot Lilay, Bereket should be released in September 2022 for his one-third of jail term in accordance with the regional law, despite having no opportunity to him.

References

External links
 Walta information Interview with Simon
 Bereket Simon Writes a Book on the Past Two Elections

Ethiopian People's Revolutionary Democratic Front politicians
Living people
Year of birth missing (living people)